Karl Emil Scherz (31 August 1860, in Loschwitz near Dresden – 10 October 1945, in Dresden) was a German architect and local historian of Blasewitz.

1860 births
1945 deaths
20th-century German historians
19th-century German architects
Local historians
German male non-fiction writers
20th-century German architects
People from Dresden